Colette Swift (born 28 July 1973) is a former road cyclist from Ireland. She represented her nation at the 2004 UCI Road World Championships.

References

External links
 profile at Procyclingstats.com

1973 births
Irish female cyclists
Living people
Place of birth missing (living people)